Nalini Negi (born 14 August 1992) is an Indian television actress and model best known for her role as Trisha Swaika in Laut Aao Trisha.

Early life and education 
She was born in Delhi, but her native place is Himachal Pradesh. She obtained a bachelor's degree from Vivekananda  Institute of Professional Studies in Guru Gobind Singh Indraprastha University in 2012.

Television

References

Indian soap opera actresses
Actresses from Himachal Pradesh
Living people
1992 births